The 1968 United States Grand Prix was a Formula One motor race held on October 6, 1968, at the Watkins Glen Grand Prix Race Course in Watkins Glen, New York. It was race 11 of 12 in both the 1968 World Championship of Drivers and the 1968 International Cup for Formula One Manufacturers. The 108-lap race was won by Matra driver Jackie Stewart after he started from second position. Graham Hill finished second for the Lotus team and Honda driver John Surtees came in third. This was the debut race of the future world champion Mario Andretti.

Summary
The first practice day was primarily a duel between Jackie Stewart and the Ferrari of Chris Amon, with Stewart posting the day's best time of 1:04.27. Stewart was unable to defend his provisional pole during the second practice day due to a broken stub-axle. However, Graham Hill bumped Amon from the second spot, before Mario Andretti—driving at Watkins Glen for the first time—rewarded the partisan crowd by taking the pole in his Gold Leaf Lotus, 0.07 seconds under Stewart's time. This was Andretti's first ever Formula One start.

On race day, a huge crowd of 93,000 anticipated a strong home showing with two other Americans also on the grid—Dan Gurney, in seventh, and Bobby Unser, in nineteenth. Stewart used a better start to take the lead on the first lap from crowd favorite Andretti. After the first lap the order was: Stewart, Andretti, Amon, Hill, Jochen Rindt, Denny Hulme, Gurney, John Surtees and Bruce McLaren.

By lap six, Andretti had opened up a gap to Amon and set off for Stewart. Three laps later, the nose on Andretti's Lotus was broken, with the right wing dragging on the ground. Andretti said though he had not touched anyone, the body had just cracked. However, he continued without losing his position until lap 13, when his pit crew taped the car back together, and dropped to thirteenth place.

On lap 10, there was a fight for third place as Amon, now behind Hill, spun on his own water spillage. In lap 6, Hulme hit an oil patch, dropping from third to ninth. On lap 26, Gurney, running in third place, did a 360° spin and was overtaken by Surtees' Honda.

After lap 33, Andretti retired with a broken clutch. Gurney then took over Surtees, as the two battled for the rest of the race. By lap 40, Stewart was 26 seconds ahead of Hill, with Gurney and Surtees another 10 seconds Hill. He then sent a message to the rest of the racers by posting the fastest lap of the race on lap 52, widening his lead to 31 seconds. Hill had struggled for a while with a loose steering column, to which he said he was driving crouched up.

On lap 97, a minute and twenty seconds ahead of Bruce McLaren, Jo Siffert's Lotus began to sputter, and he signaled to his pit that he would stop to refuel in the next round. As Siffert then exited the pit lane, McLaren went by into fifth place.

Siffert regained the position after two laps, before which McLaren too had to stop for fuel. Surtees then began to back off when he realised Gurney, just ahead in third place, was slowing down because he had a slow puncture and was also running very low on fuel. Surtees used the opportunity catch up with Gurney's McLaren in the last lap, as they both finished a lap down to the leaders.

Stewart led every lap in his Matra-Ford and was threatened only once, when he rounded a corner to find two spectators walking across the track. "It's as close as I've ever come to running somebody over," he said, "I missed them by an inch." It was his first American Grand Prix victory and kept alive hopes for his first World Drivers' Championship with just one more race to go. "It was the first time in my F1 career I felt I could dictate the pace," he said, "When I went faster, the field went faster. When I went slower, they went slower. It was an extraordinary moment of realisation."

The race promoters claimed that Stewart's prize of £8,300 for winning the race was the richest in F1 history. Andretti's Lotus teammate Hill, also in the running for the season's title along with Denny Hulme, finished 24 seconds behind Stewart in second place. This was the final all-British podium, .

Classification

Qualifying

* Pescarolo also drove car number 21 as a spare car.

Race

Championship standings after the race

Drivers' Championship standings

Constructors' Championship standings

Note: Only the top five positions are included for both sets of standings.

References

Further reading
 Doug Nye (1978). The United States Grand Prix and Grand Prize Races, 1908-1977. B. T. Batsford. 
 Rob Walker (January, 1969). "1968 U. S. Grand Prix: Money & The Scot". Road & Track, 29-34.

External links

Photos from the 1968 United States Grand Prix at Watkins Glen

United States Grand Prix
United States Grand Prix
United States Grand Prix
United States Grand Prix
United States Grand Prix